Sir Roger James Elliott  (8 December 1928 – 16 April 2018) was a British theoretical physicist specialising in the magnetic, semiconductor, and optical properties of condensed matter.

Born in Chesterfield, Elliott obtained a DPhil in mathematics and theoretical physics from the University of Oxford in 1952. He was a research fellow at the University of California, Berkeley, in 1952–3, then at the Atomic Energy Research Establishment until 1955, when he was appointed to a lecturership at the University of Reading. He returned to the University of Oxford in 1957, where he was the Wykeham Professor of Physics from 1974 until 1988. He served as chief executive of Oxford University Press from 1988 until 1993.

The Institute of Physics awarded the Maxwell Medal and Prize jointly to Elliott and Kenneth William Harry Stevens in 1968, and the Guthrie Medal and Prize to Elliott in 1990. Elliott was elected a fellow of the Royal Society in 1976 and knighted in 1987. He has been awarded honorary Doctor of Science degrees by the universities of Paris (1983), Bath (1991), and Essex (1993). Elliott died on 16 April 2018 at the age of 89.

He was the cousin of mathematician Robert J. Elliott.

See also
Elliott formula

References

External links
Homepage at the Rudolf  Peierls Centre for Theoretical Physics, University of Oxford.

1928 births
2018 deaths
English physicists
Members of Academia Europaea
Fellows of New College, Oxford
Fellows of St John's College, Oxford
People from Chesterfield, Derbyshire
Fellows of the Royal Society
Knights Bachelor
Maxwell Medal and Prize recipients
Wykeham Professors of Physics
Fellows of the American Physical Society